TPJ may refer to:

 The PracTeX Journal, an online journal focussing on practical use of the TeX typesetting system
 The Perl Journal, a former journal which focused on the Perl programming language.
 Tapieté, an indigenous language of Argentina (ISO 639 code tpj).
 Temporoparietal junction, a region of brain where the temporal and parietal lobes meet.
 Texans for Public Justice, a non-profit group.
 Tiruchirappalli Junction railway station (station code TPJ).
 Tiruchirappalli Railway Division, a division of Southern Railway Zone of India (reporting mark) .
 Triple Plate Junction PLC, a gold mining and exploration company involved in the reverse takeover of Namesco.
 Tak and the Power of Juju, children's TV series and video game.
Tevita Pangai Jr, rugby league player for the Brisbane Broncos.